The Bridge River is an approximately  long river in southern British Columbia. It flows south-east from the Coast Mountains. Until 1961, it was a major tributary of the Fraser River, entering that stream about six miles upstream from the town of Lillooet; its flow, however, was near-completely diverted into Seton Lake with the completion of the Bridge River Power Project, with the water now entering the Fraser just south of Lillooet as a result.

The Bridge River hydroelectric complex, operated by BC Hydro, consists of three successive dams, providing water for four hydro power plants with the total rated power of total 492 megawatts.

Name 
Its name in the Lillooet language is Xwisten (pronounced Hwist'n), sometimes spelled Nxwisten or Nxo-isten).  Dubbed Riviere du Font by Simon Fraser's exploring party in 1808, it was for a while known by the English version of that name, Fountain River, and some old maps show it as Shaw's River, after the name of one of Fraser's men.

The Bridge River Ocean, an ancient ocean, takes its name from the Bridge River.

Course

The Big Canyon
Upstream from Moha the now-dry riverbed runs through the immense gorge of the Bridge River Canyon, which lies immediately downstream from Terzaghi Dam, the principal dam of the Bridge River Power Project.  Terzaghi Dam forms Carpenter Lake, the longest and largest of the power project's reservoirs at about 40 kilometres.  Just upstream from Gold Bridge, which is at the upper end of Carpenter Lake, is Lajoie Dam, which forms Downton Lake.

Its confluence with the Fraser occurs at a double gorge formed by the two rivers, which are forced through narrow banks at this point and so reminiscent of a fountain (in another version of the name, the surname of one of Fraser's men was supposedly du Font, giving the location its name of the Lower Fountains (the Upper Fountains being another few miles upstream on the Fraser, today's community of Fountain  The river came to be called the Bridge River due to the location of a bridge across the Fraser at this point, originally a pole-structure built by the native St'at'imc people but replaced at the time of the Fraser Canyon Gold Rush in 1858 by a white-run tollbridge.

Tributaries
Because of the diversion of the river to Seton Lake by Terzaghi Dam and tunnels through Mission Mountain, which is in that area the south flank of the Bridge, what Bridge River water enters the Fraser now is largely the flow of one of the Bridge's tributaries, the Yalakom River.  The Yalakom, whose name means 'the ewe of the mountain sheep' in the Chilcotin language, was in old times known as the North Fork of the Bridge.  The South Fork of the Bridge River is many miles upstream, at the community of Gold Bridge, and is today known as the Hurley River (originally Hamilton's River).  Several other large feeder streams contribute to the diverted flow of the Bridge, including Gun Creek, Tyaughton Creek, Marshall Creek, and Cadwallader Creek; the last-named is a tributary of the Hurley, about 15 kilometres upstream from its confluence with the Bridge.

Economy

Hydroelectricity

Bridge River Power Project harnesses the power of the Bridge River, by diverting it through a mountainside to the separate drainage basin of Seton Lake, utilizing a system of three dams, four powerhouses and a canal. The powerhouses have a maximum generating capacity of 480 MW and an average annual production of 2670 GWh. Development of the system began in 1927 and was completed in 1960. The waters initially pass through the Lajoie Dam and powerhouse and are then diverted through tunnels and penstocks from Carpenter Reservoir to the two powerhouses on Seton Lake Reservoir.

Fishery
Due to the force of the rivers at the Bridge's original confluence into the Fraser, the area has been for millennia the most important inland salmon-fishing site on the Fraser.  The flow of the Bridge River, however, was near-completely diverted into Seton Lake with the completion of the Bridge River Power Project in 1961, with the water now entering the Fraser River just south of Lillooet as a result.  The salmon fishery of the Bridge River was near-entirely destroyed by this diversion.

Gold mining
It is along Cadwallader Creek that the major mines of the Bridge River goldfields are located at Bralorne and Pioneer Mine.  Other mining towns and camps built around mines in the Bridge River goldfields were Minto City, Wayside, Congress, Lajoie, Haylmore and Brexton (aka Fish Lake).  Around Bralorne other localities such as Ogden grew up along road right-of-ways and slips of land between the mineral claims which dominate the northwestern flank of the Bendor Range in this area, providing services not approved of by company towns, including "sporting houses", some of which were also in Gold Bridge until forced to move to Minto as Gold Bridge became larger.  Other gold-mining activity is found throughout the river's basin.  During the 19th Century, large hydraulic mining operations lined the banks of the river for the thirty kilometres between the community of Moha, at the confluence of the Yalakom and the Bridge.

Environment

Spruce Lake Protected Area
Gun Creek and Tyaughton Creek jointly drain the south flank of the protected wilderness area known as the Spruce Lake Protected Area, popularly known as the South Chilcotin although the area is not actually in the Chilcotin, which lies north of it, but in the Chilcotin Ranges.  The official designation for the area has changed since it was first proposed for a park in the 1930s, due to the efforts of the prospecting and mining community in the goldfield towns.  The protectionist vs. resource extraction battle over that area has raged since that time, and names used in debates for the area have included the Charlie Cunningham Wilderness, the Spruce Lake-Eldorado Study Area , the Spruce Lake-Eldorado Management Planning Unit (SLRMP), Southern Chilcotin Mountains Provincial Park, and South Chilcotin Provincial Park.  In 2007 the name was changed again to the Spruce Lake Protected Area, reflective of the government's downgrading of the area from park to mixed-use in certain areas.

See also
List of tributaries of the Fraser River
Bridge River Country
Bridge River, British Columbia
Bridge River Ocean
Bridge River Indian Band
Bridge River Cones
Bridge River Ash
Chief Hunter Jack
Gold Bridge
Bralorne
Pioneer Mine
Brexton
Gun Lake
Minto City
Moha
Rexmount
Tyaughton Lake

References

External links
Bridge River-Lillooet Country Archive
Canadian Mountain Encyclopedia
Lost Treasure in British Columbia

History of British Columbia
Tributaries of the Fraser River
Canyons and gorges of British Columbia
Bridge River Country
Lillooet Country
Rivers of the Pacific Ranges